The Baslerstab is a Swiss German-language free daily newspaper.

History and profile
The paper was launched in 1977 as a result of the merger of the Basler Nachrichten and the National-Zeitung. The paper is published by Basler Zeitung Medien in Basel.

It is published in three forms a city edition and online newspaper, both from Monday through Friday; and a regional edition on Wednesdays and Fridays.

, the newspaper had a circulation of 194,358 copies per day.

Basler Zeitung Medien also publishes the Basler Zeitung.

See also
 List of newspapers in Switzerland

Notes

External links 
 baslerstab.ch (in German-language), the newspaper's official website

1977 establishments in Switzerland
Newspapers established in 1977
Mass media in Basel
Free daily newspapers
German-language newspapers published in Switzerland
Daily newspapers published in Switzerland